Greenlake is a rural locality in the Livingstone Shire, Queensland, Australia.

History 
The locality presumably takes its name from Green Lake, a lake in the west of the locality.

References 

Shire of Livingstone
Localities in Queensland